"Money, Power & Respect" is the second single released from the Lox's debut album of the same name. The song was produced by Hitmen members D-Dot and Amen-Ra and featured DMX, who contributed the song's fourth verse.  The song's chorus is performed by Lil' Kim; its motif is consistent with German sociologist Max Weber's Three-component theory of social stratification, which recognizes that one's wealth, power, and prestige, affects one's independent capability or ability to act on one's will. The track samples Dexter Wansel's 1979 song "New Beginning".

Released as the follow-up to their debut single, "If You Think I'm Jiggy", which peaked at No. 30 on the Billboard Hot 100, "Money, Power & Respect" was an even bigger success, reaching 18 on the Hot 100 and topping the Hot Rap Singles chart at No. 1. To date, the song remains the group's most successful single and was certified gold by the RIAA for sales of 500,000 copies on April 28, 1998.

In addition to the Money, Power & Respect album, the song was among the tracks on The Source Presents: Hip Hop Hits, Vol. 2, Music Inspired by Scarface, Survival of the Illest and Bad Boy's Greatest Hits. It was also used as entrance music for professional wrestler Jazz in Extreme Championship Wrestling.

Single track listing

A-Side
"Money, Power & Respect" (Club Mix)- 4:30
"Money, Power & Respect" (Instrumental)- 5:12

B-Side
"Bitches From Eastwick" (Club Mix)- 4:13
"If You Think I'm Jiggy" (Remix)- 4:38

Charts

Weekly charts

Year-end charts

Certifications

References

1997 songs
1998 singles
The Lox songs
DMX (rapper) songs
Lil' Kim songs
Bad Boy Records singles
Mafioso rap songs
Songs written by Jadakiss